Leah Shaw is a fictional character from the television series The Walking Dead, where she is portrayed by Lynn Collins.

Television series

Season 10
In the episode "Find Me", shortly after Rick's supposed death, Daryl wanders the woods alone trying to find any sign of him, dead or alive. Daryl is approached by a Belgian Malinois puppy, who leads him to a cabin. Upon entering the cabin, Daryl is taken hostage and interrogated by an unknown woman, but she soon lets him go when he explains that he doesn't want to hurt her. She refuses to tell Daryl her name; he asks what the dog's name is, and she says that she simply calls him "Dog". Over the next several months, the two periodically cross paths, with Daryl returning Dog when he runs away, and offering her a fish that he caught. She reveals her name, Leah, and the two begin to bond romantically, with Daryl staying at her cabin more often. The pair bond through hunting, fishing, and watching a solar eclipse together. One night, Daryl catches her looking at a photo of her son, which she keeps under the floorboards, and she recounts the story of how she lost her family and the Army platoon she had been surviving with. Dog was born on the same day, and Leah kept him as a memento of the family she lost. Fed up with his obsession with the search for Rick, Leah urges him to choose between looking for Rick, going back to Alexandria, or staying with her. Daryl chooses to continue searching for Rick. After an unknown period of time, Daryl returns to the cabin after Dog finds him, hoping to make amends, but finds Leah missing, along with the pictures under the floorboards. He leaves several cans of food under the floorboards, along with a message saying that he wants to be with her and encouraging her to try to find him. With Leah gone, Daryl adopts Dog for himself. In the present, Daryl returns to the cabin with Carol, only to find no sign that Leah has ever returned.

Season 11
In the episode "Rendition", in the woods, Daryl flees the Reaper attack with Dog. A Reaper tries to stop him, throwing Dog down a hill, but Daryl fights them off. Another Reaper stops their companions from attacking Daryl, allowing him to escape. The following morning, Daryl finds Dog sitting next to a Reaper, who reveals herself to be Leah, Daryl's former romantic partner and Dog's former owner. Leah asks Daryl if he is with Maggie's group. Daryl lies and says he only bumped into them on the road, but Leah is unconvinced. Daryl tries to take Dog and leave, but Dog refuses to leave Leah's side as a group of Reapers surround them. Daryl is taken to Meridian and tied to a chair in a shed. Daryl confides to Leah that he came back and looked everywhere for her before Leah puts him unconscious. Daryl soon wakes up gasping for air as Reapers waterboard him for information about Maggie's group, and they continue to torture him until Leah orders them to stop. Daryl is locked in a nearby cell, and Leah again orders Daryl to surrender any information lest he face the wrath of the her leader, Pope. At Pope's quarters, Leah learns that another Reaper, Michael, was found dead. Leah returns to Daryl's cell as Frost is taken away for interrogation, and confides her grief over Michael, who she saw as a younger brother. Daryl again says that he returned to her cabin to be with her, but she wasn't there. Leah admits she still has feelings for Daryl, who says he would help her if he could and claims he is telling the truth about not being part of Maggie's group. Daryl offers vague details, and Leah reports back to Pope, and convinces Pope to let Daryl join them. That night, Daryl and Leah are left alone in the interrogation room, only to be locked inside; the shed is set on fire and the room is engulfed in flames. Daryl is able to break through a window and helps Leah out of the burning room, and follows her to safety outside, where they find all of the Reapers gathered. Pope, impressed that Daryl not only escaped but saved Leah before himself, welcomes Daryl into the group. In his quarters, Pope explains how the Reapers are veterans traumatized during the War in Afghanistan. Struggling to cope with civilian life after finishing their deployment, they became mercenaries until society fell. After the fall, the politicians who hired them tried to exterminate them in a fire, but they survived, believing to be chosen by God. In the episode "On the Inside", Daryl remains at the Reapers' hideout, where he witnesses Carver interrogate Frost. Pope tasks Daryl with continuing the interrogation. Frost reveals that they're meeting up at a yellow house when Daryl cuts one of his fingers off, and Leah agrees to lead a team to investigate the house. Leah asks Daryl to come with them, which upsets Carver. When Leah's search party arrives at the yellow house, Daryl covertly signals Maggie, Negan, Gabriel, and Elijah, who hide in a compartment in the floor to avoid the Reapers. The Reapers search until they come upon Maggie's house. Carver questions if Daryl is loyal to the Reapers, but Leah suggests they check the remaining houses. Carver finds the hidden door but upon lifting up the carpet, it is empty. After checking all the buildings, Leah's group arrive back at Meridian and tell Pope that they didn't find anyone. They see Frost's dead body tied to a pole, and Pope says that he got everything he needed out of Frost, before bringing Carver inside Meridian. In the episode "Promises Broken", two Reapers return to Meridian and inform Pope that they couldn't find Maggie's group. Pope is infuriated, but Leah intervenes and takes the blame. Pope angrily orders Leah and Daryl to scout the area again. While walking alone, Daryl asks Leah about the Reapers' history; Leah says they took Meridian because they needed a place to stay, and that they are only hunting Maggie so she doesn't try to take revenge. Leah confides in Daryl that she sees Pope as a father figure and that his recent behavior is unusual. Daryl and Leah come across a lone survivor, who claims he is looking for supplies for his sick wife. Leah radios Pope and asks what to do, and Pope orders them to kill the survivor and his family. The survivor leads Leah and Daryl to his hideout, where his sick wife and son are. Leah tells the man to leave with his son and never return, and he obliges as Daryl mercy kills his wife when Leah can't bring herself to do it.

In the first part finale "For Blood", when the Reapers stop hearing from Paul they assume he is dead, which Pope reveals he assumed would happen. Leah confronts Pope, but he insists that sometimes sacrifices are necessary. Negan and Elijah lead the herd back to Meridian's walls, which trigger landmines and explosives around the perimeter. Daryl meets Leah on a rooftop, and sensing her discomfort at Pope's recent decisions, invites her to run away with him. When she refuses, Daryl confesses that he is with Maggie's group, and that they were hiding among the dead horde. Despite feeling betrayed, Leah keeps his secret from Pope when he arrives on the rooftop, unveiling a hwacha. As the Reapers on the ground struggle to fend the walkers off, Pope orders the hwacha to be fired. Leah points out that this will also kill the Reapers on the ground, and stabs him to death when he won't back down. However, she refuses Daryl’s invitation to join her because of his killing of a reaper running to defend Pope, and radios her comrades that he killed Pope. Daryl flees and joins Maggie and Negan in fighting the Reapers and walkers in the battle at the gates, only for the Reapers to pull back. Leah, having taken command of the Reapers, then orders the hwacha to be fired upon the group and their horde.

In the second part premiere "No Other Way," Maggie's group manages to avoid the hwacha which destroys the entire horde and accidentally kills a Reaper that gets hit by a rocket. The Reapers and Maggie's group engage in a game of cat-and-mouse throughout Meridian, resulting in the deaths of most of the Reapers and the capture of Carver who had murdered Maggie's friend Elijah's sister. Knowing how important family is to Leah and Carver in particular, Daryl offers to trade Carver for the surviving Reapers leaving without any further trouble so that both he and Leah can protect their families. After Gabriel kills her sniper Jenson and takes his rifle, Leah agrees to the deal, although Maggie refuses to let her have Carver. As Leah begins to walk away with Boone and Washington, Elijah reminds Maggie of her promise to make the Reapers pay for everyone that they killed. In response, Maggie opens fire, literally shooting the retreating Reapers in the back, killing Boone and Washington and wounding Leah. As Maggie kills Carver, Daryl finds Leah hiding. Having never wanted things to go down like this, Daryl allows Leah to escape, but he warns her that he will kill her if they ever meet again.

In "The Rotten Core," six months later, it's revealed that Leah was responsible for the murder of several Commonwealth soldiers and theft of Lance Hornsby's secret weapons' shipment, leading to the disastrous events at Riverbend. Now a much more feral survivor, Leah is consumed by a desire to get revenge against Maggie for the deaths of her entire family, the Reapers. In "Trust" and "Acts of God," after discovering Leah's culpability, Lance hires her as an assassin to kill Maggie for him, providing Leah with several soldiers to assault the Hilltop. However, Leah sacrifices her own men to spring a trap left Maggie, Elijah, Lydia and Marco, uncaring about the loss of life. Leah kills Marco and captures Maggie, taking Maggie back to her old cabin that Leah had lived in when she and Daryl first got to know each other. Leah announces her intention to kill everyone that Maggie loves first in order to make her suffer before finally killing Maggie. Managing to break free, Maggie engages Leah in a brutal fight throughout the cabin, ending with Leah nearly stabbing Maggie to death. Having deduced Leah's role in the events, Daryl manages to track his former lover back to the cabin and he shoots Leah in the head, killing her and saving Maggie's life. As Daryl and Maggie flee Lance and his approaching forces, Leah's body is left lying on the floor of the cabin where she had once spent so much time with Daryl before she had rejoined the Reapers.

Development and reception
Lynn Collins was cast as Leah, the former owner of Dog who formed a loving connection with Daryl while searching for Rick after his disappearance; her casting was first announced on December 29, 2020. The tenth season episode "Find Me" features Lynn Collins as Leah, who forms a romantic bond with Daryl. Paul Daily of TV Fanatic wrote: "Leah had some severe abandonment issues, and when you consider everything she lost, it was inevitable that she would struggle to keep it together if she lost Daryl." Robert Balkovich for Looper wrote that "Even more than Daryl, Leah is clearly someone who has a hard time letting people into her life. Losing her son and her family was a profoundly traumatic moment, and she has a hard time watching Daryl leave her to keep searching for Rick." Ron Hogan of Den of Geek wrote: "The Leah relationship works thanks in no small part to the performances of Norman Reedus and Lynn Collins, who go from adversarial to intimate over the course of multiple jumps in time."

In season eleven she was revealed to be Leah Shaw, a member of the Reapers. Leah is first seen in this season in the episode "Rendition", but Lynn Collins revealed that Leah appeared in the previous episode in a mask tracking Daryl. Ron Hogan of Den of Geek praised the direction in the episode and the performances of Reedus and Collins in their scenes together, writing that: "Nicole Mirante-Matthews walks a fine line in these moments, with Daryl and Leah pushing at one another without losing that core connection." Writing for Forbes, Erik Kain criticized the storyline, asking "Who cares about Leah? Clearly not Daryl, and so why should we?"

Writing for Forbes, Erik Kain writes that in the episode "Promises Broken" a wounded woman "asks them to put her out of her misery but Leah can't do it, so Daryl does instead, showing mercy to both women at once. It's this glimpse of Leah as a more compassionate human being that makes Daryl very nearly reveal the truth to her." Ron Hogan for Den of Geek reviewed the first part finale "For Blood", writing that: "Pope's instability grows with every interaction with Norman Reedus's Daryl (who has some solid character moments this week) and Lynn Collins's Leah (likewise). Reedus and Collins really play well off one another, without it being too obvious how things will play out for either character, or for the rest of the Reapers." Erik Kain for Forbes praised the episode, saying: "I liked the twist of Leah killing Pope and then just taking over as the new Reaper boss rather than running off with Daryl into the sunset. She was more ruthless than he realized. Hell hath no fury like a woman scorned, and he's broken her trust twice now. What did he expect?"

References

The Walking Dead (franchise) characters